NA-178 may refer to:

NA-178 (Muzaffargarh-III), a former constituency of the National Assembly of Pakistan
NA-178 (Rahim Yar Khan-IV), a constituency of the National Assembly of Pakistan